= Family (U.S. census) =

Type of family as defined by the United States Census Bureau

A family is defined by the United States Census Bureau for statistical purposes as "a group of two people or more (one of whom is the householder) related by birth, marriage, or adoption, and residing together; all such people (including related subfamily members) are considered as members of one family."

A family household is more inclusive, consisting of "a household maintained by a householder who is in a family (as defined above), and includes any unrelated people (unrelated subfamily members and/or secondary individuals) who may be residing there."

In 2014, the US Census Bureau began including same-sex marriages in their counts of families and family households. Prior to this, they were counted as cohabiting partners; thus, they were not considered as forming a family.
